Flight 476 may refer to:

American Airlines Flight 476, crashed on 4 August 1955
British Airways Flight 476, crashed on 10 September 1976

0476